Brithysana is a genus of moths of the family Noctuidae.

Species
 Brithysana africana Laporte, 1973
 Brithysana maura (Saalmüller, 1891)
 Brithysana pauliani Viette, 1967
 Brithysana speyeri (Felder & Rogenhofer, 1874)

References
 Brithysana at Markku Savela's Lepidoptera and Some Other Life Forms
 Natural History Museum Lepidoptera genus database

Hadeninae